The following is a list of political parties on the Isle of Man.

Active parties
 Isle of Man Green Party
 Liberal Vannin Party
 Manx Labour Party
 Mec Vannin

As of January 2023, all bar three members of both branches of Tynwald are independents.

Political pressure groups
 Alliance for Progressive Government (APG)
 Positive Action Group (PAG)
 
 Manx Independence Movement (MIM)
 Manx Progressive Party (MPP)
 Isle of Man Climate Change Coalition (CCC)
 Isle of Man Student Climate Network (IOMSCN)
 Isle of Man Libertarians (IOMLUK)
 Free Public Transport: Isle of Man (Fare Free Campaign)

, although an electoral party in its early years (several MHKs are ex-members) has evolved into a quasi-pressure group.

Defunct parties

 Independent Labour
 National Party
 Manx National Party
 Liberal Party
 Manx People's Political Association

See also

 Politics of the Isle of Man
 List of political parties by country

External links
 https://web.archive.org/web/20110727082404/http://mhkstheyworkforyou.org/default.aspx Access to work & info of members of Tynwald

Man, Isle of
 
Political parties
Isle of Man
Political parties